Classified is the third studio album and fourth overall album released through Decca Records by the classical crossover string quartet Bond. Lead single "Explosive" was released as a double A-side with a different version of "Highly Strung". This updated version featured on the special edition of Classified.

Popular worldwide, Classified found success in Australia where it went double platinum. "Explosive" was also picked to be the Australian theme for the 2004 Athens Olympic Games.

"Explosive" is also used regularly during New York Rangers ice hockey games at Madison Square Garden as the intermission music prior to a shootout, should the game reach that phase.

In Japan, a special edition with different artwork was released. It features three bonus tracks ("Caravan", "Carmina" and "Sugarplum"), which were later featured on their greatest hits album Explosive: The Best of Bond.

Track listing

Bonus videos
"Explosive" (Promo video)
Making of "Explosive"
"Samba" (Promo video)

Charts

Certifications

References

Bond (band) albums
2004 albums
Decca Records albums